USS LCI(L)-93 was an amphibious assault ship (Landing Craft Infantry – Large), commissioned in 1943 by the United States Coast Guard. It participated in the Operation Husky Landings in Sicily on 10 July 1943, as well as the landings at Salerno, Italy.

Normandy Invasion
As part of the massive amphibious force created for The Normandy Invasion, LCI(L)-93 took part in the landings at Omaha Beach on D-Day, 6 June 1944. After offloading its second cargo of American troops, the vessel became stranded between the shore and a sandbar. German Artillery then opened fire on the vulnerable ship, seriously wounding several soldiers and Coast Guardsmen. Among those injured were Stewards Mate 2/c John Roberts, an African American crewman, who lost his leg when an enemy shell passed through a bulkhead.

Badly damaged, LCI(L)-93 was lost as a result of this action.

In Art and Television
In addition to several photographs taken of LCI(L)-93 after the battle, several paintings of Omaha Beach depict the ship under fire on D-Day. The story of LCI(L)-93 was also told in The History Channel documentary A Distant Shore: African Americans of D-Day, with veteran John Roberts recounting his story of the ship's action at Normandy.

References

External links
 http://www.uscg.mil/History/WEBCUTTERS/LCI_93.pdf
 http://www.navsource.org/archives/10/15/150093.htm

1943 ships
LCI(L)-351-class large infantry landing craft
World War II amphibious warfare vessels of the United States
Ships built in Orange, Texas
Operation Overlord
Maritime incidents in June 1944
Shipwrecks of France
Ships sunk by coastal artillery